William John Vohaska (May 17, 1929 – December 24, 2004) was an American football player.  

Vohaska was born in 1929 in Riverside, Illinois. He attended Morton High School in Cicero.

He played college football for the Illinois Fighting Illini football team at the center position from 1948 to 1950.  He was selected by the Associated Press as the first-team center on its 1950 College Football All-America Team. 

Vohaska later worked as a coach and teacher. He taught at Morton High School beginning in 1954 and later at Morton College.  He also founded and operated the Riverside Day Camp in Riverside, Illinois. 

Vohaska died in 2000 at a hospice home in Venice, Florida.

References

1929 births
American football centers
2004 deaths
Illinois Fighting Illini football players
People from Riverside, Illinois
Players of American football from Illinois